Mihalț is a commune located in Alba County, Transylvania, Romania. It has a population of 3,051 (2011), and is composed of four villages: Cistei (Oláhcsesztve), Mihalț, Obreja (Obrázsa) and Zărieș (Zerjes).

In Mihalț, there is a folklore group called „Banul Mihalcea”. It has first performed in 1906 and it is active ever since. Their most important dance is called „Jocul de Haidău”.

Natives
Dorin Giurgiuca

References

Communes in Alba County
Localities in Transylvania